Wild Horse Hank is a 1979 Canadian adventure drama film directed by Eric Till and starring Linda Blair, Michael Wincott and Richard Crenna. It is based on the 1978 teen novel The Wild Horse Killers written by Mel Ellis.

Plot 
Wild Horse Hank is the adventure of a brave young cowgirl named Hank (Linda Blair), who is independent and has been around horses all her life. One day while out searching for her prized stallion, Hank happens upon some horse hunters who are rounding up a herd of mustangs to sell for pet food. Hank follows the hunters into town and releases the horses. If Hank is to save these wild animals, they must reach the protection of federal land, but the nearest such area lies across a desert, through a river, and over a mountain range, altogether some 150 miles away.

Pace,  Hank's father (Richard Crenna), objects to Hank's plan to save the horses, but finally agrees to let her go. Hank begins her adventure, herding the horses toward the Rantan Game Preserve, but the epic drive soon becomes a contest of wills with the poachers, who are trying to outwit Hank whenever possible.

Cast 
Linda Blair as Hank Bradford
Michael Wincott as Charlie Connors
Richard Crenna as Pace Bradford
Al Waxman as Jay Conors
Lloyd Berry as Foreman
Richard Fitzpatrick as Clay
Barbara Gordon as Marlene Connors
Helen Hughes as Mrs Webley
Stephen E. Miller as Harper
James D. Morris as Sheriff Walter Mack
Richard J. Reynolds as Rankin

Production
The film was shot on location at Dinosaur Provincial Park and Waterton Lakes National Park in Alberta, Canada between August and October 1978 and was broadcast in 1982 as a television network premiere. It is also known under the alternate titles: Hard Ride Hank, Hard Ride to Rantan, Long Shot in the United States.

DVD release
Wild Horse Hank was released on DVD on September 16, 2008 for the 1st time.

References

External links
 
 

1979 films
1970s adventure drama films
Canadian adventure drama films
Canadian independent films
English-language Canadian films
Films directed by Eric Till
Films shot in Alberta
Canadian drama television films
1979 independent films
1979 drama films
1970s English-language films
1970s Canadian films